Yasmine P. Taeb is an Iranian-American human rights attorney and Democratic National Committee official. She is a senior policy counsel at the Center for Victims of Torture. In 2014 she sought the Democratic nomination for election to the Virginia House of Delegates in the 48th district; after moving to the district to run, she challenged Virginia Senate Minority Leader Dick Saslaw in the June 2019 Democratic primary for the 35th district, but came in second place.

Early life and education
At the age of six, Taeb, along with her mother and three siblings, fled Iran during the Iran-Iraq War, seeking refuge in the United States. According to her campaign video, she entered the United States via a hole in a wire fence on the U.S.-Mexico border undocumented and was “caught by U.S. authorities.”  She was raised in Florida, where she attended Marjory Stoneman Douglas High School in Parkland.

Taeb received a B.A. in political science from the University of Florida and a Graduate Certificate in International Human Rights Law from Oxford University. She holds a J.D. from the Penn State Dickinson School of Law.

Political career
Taeb is a senior policy counsel at the Center for Victims of Torture.

In 2014, she was one of seven candidates for the Democratic nomination in the special election to succeed Bob Brink as representative of the 48th district in the Virginia House of Delegates. At an event organised by the National Iranian American Council, she stated she considers herself a "lifelong activist" and emphasized the necessity of Iranians' engaging directly in civic life.

She attended the 2016 Democratic National Convention as a delegate for Bernie Sanders.

Taeb was critical of the nomination of Gina Haspel to head the Central Intelligence Agency, stating that Haspel was "personally responsible for the near-total secrecy that continues to shroud her background" and that senators did not have access to sufficient information to make an informed decision on the nomination. Taeb criticised DNC Chairman Tom Perez's endorsement of Andrew Cuomo, arguing it would not reflect well on the Democratic National Committee. According to Taeb, the DNC should not only be inclusive to people of different races and backgrounds, but should also allow members to be diverse in thoughts and ideas.

Taeb, who has led research into anti-Islamic sentiment for the Center for American Progress, was opposed to Executive Order 13780, claiming that it was a policy centered on "advancing a white nationalist agenda".

On September 20, 2018, after moving from Arlington to Falls Church, Taeb announced she would be challenging Virginia Senate Minority Leader Dick Saslaw for the 35th district in the state's June Democratic primary. She came in second place, with approximately 46% of the vote to Saslaw's 49%.

Private life
Taeb is a practicing Muslim.

References 

Year of birth missing (living people)
Living people
Iranian emigrants to the United States
American politicians of Iranian descent
Dickinson School of Law alumni
University of Florida alumni
Virginia lawyers
American Muslims
People from Parkland, Florida